Rzeczki  is a village in the administrative district of Gmina Ciechanów, within Ciechanów County, Masovian Voivodeship, in east-central Poland.

The village has an approximate population of 150.

References

Rzeczki